Chapters is the second greatest hits compilation by Finnish metal band Amorphis, released in 2003. The first disc is a CD containing some of their most popular songs, and the second disc is a bonus DVD featuring the music videos recorded to promote their music.

Track listing 
All tracks by Amorphis.

Disc one

Disc two – DVD

Personnel

Amorphis 
 Esa Holopainen – lead guitar
 Tomi Koivusaari – rhythm guitar, growled vocals (disc 1: 7-17, disc 2: 4-5)
 Niclas Etelävuori – bass guitar (disc 1: 1 & 2, disc 2: 1)
 Santeri Kallio – keyboards (disc 1: 1-6, disc 2: 1 & 2)
 Pasi Koskinen – clean vocals (disc 1: 1-10, disc 2: 1-4), growled vocals (disc 1: 5)
 Jan Rechberger – drums (disc 1: 11-17, disc 2: 5), keyboards (disc 1: 15-17)

Additional musicians 
 Pekka Kasari – drums  (disc 1: 1-10, disc 2: 1-4)
 Olli-Pekka Laine – bass guitar (disc 1: 3-17, disc 2: 2-5)
 Kim Rantala – keyboards (disc 1: 7-10, disc 2: 3 & 4)
 Kasper Mårtenson – keyboards (disc 1: 11-14, disc 2: 5)

Other personnel 
 Dean D. Edington Jr. – Project Coordinator
 Scott Hull – Remastering
 Mikko Karmila – Engineer
 Orion Landau – Cover Design
 Don Poe – Mastering
 Gavin Price – Design
 Tomas Skogsberg – Engineer

References 

Amorphis albums
2003 compilation albums
2003 video albums
Music video compilation albums
Relapse Records compilation albums
Relapse Records video albums